Großer Teufelssee is a lake in the Rostock district in Mecklenburg-Vorpommern, Germany. At an elevation of 37.4 m, its surface area is 0.205 km².

Lakes of Mecklenburg-Western Pomerania
 Denari Baloch